John Bruton (21 November 1903 – 13 March 1986) was a professional footballer and manager who spent the major part of his career in both capacities with Blackburn Rovers.

Playing career
Born in Westhoughton, near Bolton, he initially played as an amateur with Wigan Borough, Bolton Wanderers and Horwich RMI while working in the coal mines before signing for Burnley as a professional in 1925 - it was reported that he came up from the pit and signed professional forms on an overturned tub at the pit head. At Turf Moor he established himself as one of the best wingers in the country and won representative honours with the Football League team. He also made three appearances for England.

He scored 44 times in 176 games for Burnley before becoming Blackburn Rovers' record £6,500 signing in December 1929. A maker of goals as well as a scorer, Bruton proved to be remarkably consistent during his playing career with Rovers. In the 1930–31 season, Bruton was Rovers' top-scorer with 19 league goals, closely followed by his unrelated namesake Les Bruton on 18.

He scored 115 times in 344 appearances for Blackburn before moving on to Preston North End in 1939, although he was prevented from making any first team appearances for Preston as a result of the outbreak of World War II.

He was awarded a benefit match in 1935 when Blackburn Rovers beat Celtic 1–0 on Monday, 22 April at Ewood Park.

Management career
After the war he returned to Ewood Park as assistant trainer and assistant secretary. During manager Will Scott's absence through illness, Bruton took over the running of the club and on Scott's return was appointed assistant manager. He was the natural successor when Rovers' lack of consistency led to Scott finally vacating the manager's chair in December 1947. On taking control Bruton's immediate aim was to avoid the team's relegation from Division 1, but nine defeats in the last ten games sealed the club's fate.

In an attempt to regain First Division status, Bruton signed Dennis Westcott, a proven goal-scorer from Wolves, and also unearthed an exciting prospect at left-back in the shape of Bill Eckersley. However, success proved just as elusive and after the club finished in fourteenth place in the Second Division, Bruton was summoned to a board meeting and dismissed in May 1949.

In 1950 he was appointed manager at Bournemouth & Boscombe Athletic, who played in the Third Division South. He remained at Dean Court for six years until 1956.

After retiring as a manager he continued as a scout for both Blackburn Rovers and Bournemouth and also for Portsmouth.

References

External links

England profile
Article in The Bolton News
Cigarette card picture at Spartacus Educational (scroll to 3rd row of cards)

1903 births
People from Westhoughton
1986 deaths
English footballers
England international footballers
Wigan Borough F.C. players
Bolton Wanderers F.C. players
Leigh Genesis F.C. players
Burnley F.C. players
Blackburn Rovers F.C. players
Preston North End F.C. players
English football managers
Blackburn Rovers F.C. managers
AFC Bournemouth managers
English Football League representative players
Association football wingers